The culture of Allentown, Pennsylvania dates back to the settlement of the city and the surrounding Lehigh Valley in the early 1700s by Germans of the Protestant Lutheran, Moravian, and Reformed faith, who fled religious persecution and war in Europe to settle in Allentown and its surrounding towns and communities. Before their arrival, the region had been historically inhabited by Lenape Native American tribes.

Allentown has played a central role in the country's development and history, serving as one of the first cities whose patriots organized (as early as 1774) in support of the American Revolution. Allentown later played a central role in hiding the Liberty Bell in the city's Zion Reformed church for nine months from September 1777 to June 1778 during the British occupation of Philadelphia; an Allentown museum, the Liberty Bell Museum, today commemorates the elaborate effort to transport and protect the Liberty Bell in Allentown during the Revolutionary War.

Allentown again played a central historical role during the American Civil War as its 47th Pennsylvania Infantry Regiment and other regiments from the region deployed in support of the Union Army following the Union's defeat at the Battle of Fort Sumter in April 1861 and ultimately emerged as one of the Union Army's boldest and most effective fighting units, tilting the Civil War in the Union's favor. 

In the 1800s, Allentown was one of the cities and regions that sparked the Industrial Revolution as the city emerged as an early national mining and industrial manufacturing hub. Allentown's Lehigh Canal, which afforded the city and region the ability to utilize the Lehigh River for the transport of coal, iron, steel, and other products from the region to primary consumer markets in New York City, Philadelphia, and other major markets made the city a center of early American industrialization, which continued until foreign competitors, regulations, trade practices, manufacturing costs, innovation and other trends combined to force its deterioration beginning in the late 1970s and continuing throughout the 1980s. 

Migration to Allentown and the region continued in the 19th and 20th century with additional inflow of German immigrants followed by waves of Italians and Asians. In the late 20th century, Hispanics, primarily Puerto Ricans arriving directly from Puerto Rico or indirectly from nearby New Jersey and New York City, immigrated to the city and currently comprise a sizable percentage of the city's population.

As of 2010, Allentown's demographic composition was 43.2% White (non-Hispanic), 42.8% Hispanic, 11.6% Black, and 2.2% Asian.

In the late 20th and early 21st century, Allentown's image and character as a rugged industrial Rust Belt city has been bolstered globally in numerous movies, television shows, and songs.

In popular culture

Allentown's reputation as a rugged blue collar city has led to many references to the city in popular culture:

Parts of the 2019 movie Glass were filmed in Allentown at the Allentown State Hospital and elsewhere.
Allentown is mentioned in the 2011 movie The Hangover Part II when Ed Helms sings a profane, modified version of "Allentown" to Zach Galifianakis as they ride in a boat in Thailand. The version appears on the film's soundtrack, The Hangover Part II: Original Motion Picture Soundtrack.
Allentown is mentioned in the lyrics of indie rock band Say Anything in their song "Fed to Death," which is the opening song on their 2009 album Say Anything. The song's lyrics also reference Nazareth, Pennsylvania.
In the 2008 movie The Wrestler, Allentown is mentioned by Mickey Rourke as a location where he had wrestled leading up to his comeback.
On Season 4, Episode 9 of the HBO series The Sopranos, titled "Whoever Did This", which aired initially on November 10, 2002, the scene in which Christopher Moltisanti is ordered by Tony Soprano to dispose of the remains of Ralph Cifaretto after Tony kills him were filmed in Lower Nazareth Township.
The television production company Medstar Television, which produced the series Medical Detectives from 1996 to 2000, and the series Forensic Files from 2000 on, is headquartered in Allentown.  Locations throughout the city have been used as settings for dramatic reenactments of crimes profiled in the shows.
Portions of the 1988 movie Hairspray were filmed at Dorney Park & Wildwater Kingdom and other Allentown locations.
The city is the subject of the popular Billy Joel song, "Allentown", originally released on The Nylon Curtain album in 1982. Joel's song uses Allentown as a metaphor for the resilience of working class Americans in distressed industrial cities during the recession of the early 1980s.
 The X-Files season 3 episode "Nisei," which aired November 25, 1995, is the first of a two-part episode in which character Dana Scully joins a UFO abductee group in Allentown.  In the season 4 episode "Memento mori," which aired February 9, 1997, characters Fox Mulder and Scully return to Allentown to follow up with one of the women from Nisei.
Allentown is referenced as the secret location of a bomb planted by The Joker in Frank Miller's comic book series, Batman: The Dark Knight Returns, published in 1986.
Allentown is the hometown of up and coming showgirl Peggy Sawyer in the long-running, Tony Award-winning Broadway musical 42nd Street, released in 1980, and its associated Academy Award-nominated movie. When Sawyer expresses her desire to leave Broadway to return to Allentown, the show's director and entire cast successfully dissuade her by singing the famed musical number "Lullaby of Broadway".
Hiding The Bell, a 1968 historical fiction novel by Ruth Nulton Moore, chronicles events surrounding American patriots' hiding of the Liberty Bell in Allentown during the American Revolutionary War in 1777 to avoid its capture by the British Army.
 Allentown was the subject of the 1963 Irving Gordon song "Allentown Jail," which was subsequently recorded by several other artists, including The Kingston Trio, The Lettermen, The Seekers and Jo Stafford.
 In the 1960 musical Bye Bye Birdie, character Rosie Alvarez is from Allentown. In the song "Spanish Rose," she sings: "I'm just a Spanish Tamale according to Mae/ Right off the boat from the tropics, far, far away/ Which is kinda funny, since where I come from is Allentown, PA."
 Allentown was mentioned in the song "200 Years Old" on the 1975 Frank Zappa album Bongo Fury.
 Dorney Park & Wildwater Kingdom, based outside of Allentown, is featured in the 1968 movie Where Angels Go, Trouble Follows.
 Exterior shots of Allentown's 24-story PPL Building are featured in the 1954 movie Executive Suite.

Media
Allentown's media includes print, web, radio and television outlets. Allentown has two daily newspapers, The Morning Call and The Express-Times, and numerous weekly and monthly print publications. Allentown has the 68th largest radio market in the United States by Arbitron. Stations licensed to Allentown include WAEB-AM (talk, news and sports), WAEB-FM (Top 40 music), WDIY (NPR and public radio), WHOL (rhythmic contemporary), WLEV (adult contemporary music), WMUH (Muhlenberg College campus radio), WSAN (Fox Sports Radio and Philadelphia Phillies broadcasts), WZZO (hard rock music) and others. In addition, many New York City and Philadelphia stations can be received in Allentown.

Allentown is part of the Philadelphia television media market.  WFMZ-TV Channel 69, based in Allentown, has studios and a transmitting site atop South Mountain. WLVT-TV, also based in Allentown, is the local PBS affiliate.
The major Philadelphia-based network stations serving Allentown include: KYW-TV (CBS), WCAU (NBC), WPVI-TV (ABC) and WTXF-TV (Fox). There are also other network and local television stations.

Recreation

Amusement parks and zoos

Dorney Park & Wildwater Kingdom is the area's main amusement park. The Lehigh Valley Zoo and the Trexler Nature Preserve are the two zoos in the Lehigh Valley. The William F. Curtis Arboretum is the area's arboretum.

Annual events

The Great Allentown Fair, one of the nation's longest standing fairs held annually since 1852, is held the end of each August and early September. Mayfair, an arts festival, is held annually on the campus of Cedar Crest College each May. Musikfest, the nation's largest free music festival, is held annually in neighboring Bethlehem each August. Das Awkscht Fescht, the country's largest antique and classic car show, is held annually in early August in neighboring Macungie; in August 2022, it will hold its 58th consecutive show.

The Lehigh Valley Spring Home Show is held annually in March at the Allentown Fairgrounds, and the Lehigh Valley Auto Show is also held annually in March at Stabler Arena in Center Valley. 

The Drum Corps International has been held for over thirty years at J. Birney Crum Stadium, bringing together the top junior drum and bugle corps in the world over two nights of competition.

Art

The Allentown Art Museum, founded in 1934, is the city's main fine art institution. The Baum School of Art, located in Center City Allentown and founded in 1926, is the city's leading art school.

The city has long struggled with graffiti throughout the city. In an effort to eliminate it, the city has painted murals in some of its city parks and high graffiti locations, arresting graffiti artists and giving out rewards for turning in those who deface buildings with graffiti.

Cuisine

Allentown is influenced by cuisine from the Pennsylvania Dutch, Hispanic and Latino Americans, and Philadelphia. Allentown has a local variant of the Philly cheesesteak, and local pizza parlors. Pennsylvania Dutch foods, including head cheese, liver pudding, sous vide, chow-chow, apple butter, and others are available at some diners across the region.  Ethnic food types represented include Dominican, Puerto Rican, West Indian, Japanese, Italian, Lebanese and Syrian. Fast food and restaurant chains have established a presence in the Lehigh Valley due to the growing population. A regionally-famous hot dog chain, Yocco's Hot Dogs, founded in 1922, maintains two restaurants in the city and two additional locations in Allentown suburbs.

Golf

Allentown and its suburbs are home to several golf courses. Saucon Valley Country Club, located in Upper Saucon Township, hosted the 2009 U.S. Women's Open. Allentown is home to a high quality city-run golf course, Allentown Municipal Golf Course, located at 3400 Tilghman Street. Others include Brookside Country Club in Macungie, Lehigh Country Club on Cedar Crest Boulevard in Allentown, Olde Homestead Golf Club in New Tripoli, Shepherd Hills Golf Club in Wescosville, and Wedgewood Golf Course in Coopersburg.

Museums
Allentown is home to multiple museums, including:
 Allentown Art Museum, art
 America On Wheels, automotive transportation
 Da Vinci Science Center, science
 George Taylor House, historic house
 Lehigh Valley Heritage Museum, local history
 Liberty Bell Museum, history
 Mack Trucks Historical Museum, automotive transportation
 Museum of Indian Culture, Native American
 Trout Hall, historic house

Music

Rock, hip hop, and punk music

Allentown has a long tradition of producing successful national musical acts and groups. In the 21st century, Pissed Jeans, a hardcore punk group founded in Allentown in 2005, and Pearls and Brass, a stoner rock band founded in 2001 from neighboring Nazareth, both started as local Allentown acts, were ultimately signed, and have since developed strong national and global followings. 

Rock and hip hop performances at Allentown nightclubs have included appearances by Hollywood Undead, Pitbull, Day26, Metro Station, Fabolous, and other performers. 

Allentown has a large radio market featuring many genres of music and also is within broadcasting reach of most major Philadelphia and New York City stations.

Symphony and bands

Allentown Symphony Orchestra performs at Miller Symphony Hall in Center City Allentown north of Hamilton Street on North 6th Street. The city also has several citizen bands, which perform at the West Park bandshell and elsewhere, including the Allentown Band, the oldest civilian concert band in the United States, the Marine Band of Allentown, the Municipal Band of Allentown, and the Pioneer Band of Allentown.

Youth Education in the Arts (YEA) is headquartered in Allentown its home and sponsors The Cadets Drum and Bugle Corps, a ten-time DCI world champion, in addition to a senior drum and bugle corps, a competitive scholastic marching band circuit, and the Urban Arts Center in the Lehigh Valley.

Shopping
The Allentown area is home to many shopping areas and several indoor malls, including Lehigh Valley Mall in Whitehall Township, South Mall in Salisbury Township, The Promenade Shops at Saucon Valley in Center Valley, The Shoppes at Trexler in Trexlertown, Whitehall Mall in Whitehall Township, and others.

Statues and memorials

American Revolutionary War

Allentown's influential role in support of the American Revolutionary War is celebrated in the city with various museums and memorials. Liberty Bell Museum inside Zion Reformed Church at 622 West Hamilton Street in Allentown honors the role Allentown played in protecting and concealing the Liberty Bell, which was hidden underneath this Allentown church's floor boards from September 1777 to June 1778 during the British Army's occupation of Philadelphia. Also, at the corner of Jordan and Gordan streets in Center City Allentown, a memorial exists on the site where General George Washington and the Continental Army housed Hessian mercenary prisoners of war during the Revolutionary War.

American Civil War
The Soldiers and Sailors Monument, located on Allentown's center square on South Seventh Street, was erected on October 19, 1899 in honor of Union Army soldiers from Allentown and local Lehigh Valley towns and boroughs who died in combat in the American Civil War.

See also
 Buildings and architecture of Allentown, Pennsylvania
 List of people from the Lehigh Valley
 Media in the Lehigh Valley

References

External links

"Famous People from the Lehigh Valley," The Morning Call, August 18, 2006

 
Allentown